Yuksporite is a rare inosilicate mineral with double width, unbranched chains, and the complicated chemical formula .
It contains the relatively rare  elements strontium, titanium and niobium, as well as the commoner metallic elements potassium, calcium, sodium and manganese.  As with all silicates, it contains groups of linked silicon and oxygen atoms, as well as some associated water molecules.

Yuksporite is a member of the umbite group that has just two known members, umbite, and yuksporite.  It was first reported in 1922, from nepheline syenite occurrences in the Kola Peninsula, Russia, and named by Alexander Fersman for the locality, near Mount Yukspor.

Unit cell 
Yuksporite was originally thought to be orthorhombic, space group unknown.  In 2004, however, the structure was solved using synchrotron radiation and found to be monoclinic 2/m with space group P21/m.  The monoclinic unit cell has two formula units per cell (Z = 2) and side lengths a = 7.126 Å, b = 24.913 Å and c = 17.075 Å, with the angle β between the a and c axes equal to 101.89°.

Appearance 
The mineral is brownish pink, rose pink or yellowish in color, with a silky to vitreous luster and a nearly white streak. It occurs in semi-transparent fibrous, scaly or lamellar aggregates up to 10 cm across.

Properties 
Yuksporite is a biaxial mineral, but most authors do not specify whether it is (+) or (-); the Handbook of Mineralogy gives it as (+). All agree, however, that the refractive indices are Nx = 1.644 and Nz = 1.660 (with Ny unspecified), which are larger than those for quartz, but similar to those for tourmaline. Yuksporite shows pleochroism, with X pale rose-yellow, and Y, Z rose-yellow. It exhibits barely detectable radioactivity.

Occurrence and associations 
The type locality is the Hackman Valley, Yukspor Mt, Khibiny Massif,  Murmanskaja Oblast', Northern Region, Russia, and type material is conserved at the Fersman Mineralogical Museum, Academy of Sciences, Moscow, Russia, catalogue number 25847. The only occurrences reported by Mindat.org are in Russia. At the Khibiny massif it occurs in veins in nepheline syenite associated with titanite, pectolite, astrophyllite, biotite and aegirine.  At the Murun Massif in the Sakha Republic it is associated with aegirine, kalsilite, potassic feldspar, titanite, lamprophyllite, wadeite and tausonite.

References

External links 
 View molecule in Jmol

Inosilicates
Potassium minerals
Strontium minerals
Manganese minerals
Monoclinic minerals
Minerals in space group 10